Diego Manuel Jadon da Silva Moreira (born 6 August 2004), also known as Moreira Jr., is professional footballer who plays as a winger for Primeira Liga club Benfica. Born in Belgium, he is a Portuguese youth international.

Early life 
Moreira was born in Liège, where his father, former Guinea-Bissau international Almami Moreira, was then playing  professional football at Standard de Liege. From his mother's side, Diego is the grandson of Helmut Graf, a German-born footballer who also played for the Belgian club from 1976 to 1982.

Club career

Early career 
Coming through the youth ranks of Standard—where his father played until 2006— Moreira first tried to leave the club from Liège in 2019 for personal reasons, training with Lierse Kempenzonen, but with the Belgian federation eventually not approving his move. He ended up leaving Les Rouches for Benfica in August 2020, signing his first professional contract with the club from Lisbon, where his father lived.

Benfica 
Moreira started to play with Benfica's under-23 in the Liga Revelação midway through the 2020–21 season. During the following season, he became a regular starter with the U23 team—scoring his first goal with the team during a 3–0 derby win against Sporting. He made his professional debut for Benfica B on the 10 January 2022, replacing Tiago Gouveia for the last 15 minutes of a 1–2 home Segunda Liga loss to rivals Porto B.

He played a major role in the UEFA Youth League, where Benfica U19 topped their group against Dynamo Kyiv, Barcelona and Bayern Munich, Moreira most notably scoring a goal against the latter during a 4–0 home win in October 2021. In the final phases, he scored a brace and provided two assists in a 4–0 derby win against Sporting in the quarter-finals; and provided another two assists in the final in a 6–0 win over Red Bull Salzburg to help Benfica win their first Youth League title, and their first title in European football since the 1961–62 European Cup.

Under interim manager Nélson Veríssimo, Moreira was promoted to Benfica's first team alongside seven other Benfica youth team players, making his debut on 13 May 2022, in a 2–0 away win to Paços de Ferreira in the Primeira Liga.

International career 
A dual citizen of Belgium and Portugal—while also eligible to play for both Guinea-Bissau and Germany—Moreira first played with the Belgium under-15 as he was a starter during their 3-1 win against Shola Shoretire and Dane Scarlett's England at St George's Park in February 2019.

But even before leaving to play his club football in Portugal, the youngster choose to switch for the Lusitanian selection in 2019, becoming a regular with the under-16 and—after a covid-interrupted 2020–21 season—with the under-18.

Style of play 
A left-footed winger able to play on both sides of the attack, Moreira is described as a fast, explosive and technically gifted footballer, most notably excelling in dribbling his opponent. He is compared to the likes of Portugal international Nani.

Honours
Benfica
Campeonato Nacional de Juniores: 2021–22
 UEFA Youth League: 2021–22
Under-20 Intercontinental Cup: 2022

References

External links
Profile at the S.L. Benfica website

Diego Moreira at playmakerstats.com

2004 births
Living people
Footballers from Liège
Belgian footballers
Bissau-Guinean footballers
Portuguese footballers
Belgium youth international footballers
Portugal youth international footballers
Belgian people of Bissau-Guinean descent
Belgian people of German descent
Belgian people of Portuguese descent
Belgian expatriate footballers
Bissau-Guinean expatriate footballers
Portuguese sportspeople of Bissau-Guinean descent
Portuguese people of German descent
Association football midfielders
S.L. Benfica B players
S.L. Benfica footballers
Liga Portugal 2 players
Primeira Liga players